Regia 200 is a NASCAR Corona Series race. Autódromo Monterrey in Apodaca, Nuevo León is the venue. The two layouts of the circuit has been used. For first time in 2011 season both layout will be used for this race.

Winners

1 Shortened 2 laps by time limit (1:20).
1 Shortened 9 laps by time limit.

Records

Most wins

NASCAR Mexico Series races
NASCAR races at Autódromo Monterrey